Francisco Rodrigues may refer to:

Francisco Rodrigues (Brazilian footballer) (1925–1988)
Francisco Rodrigues (Portuguese footballer) (1914–?)
Francisco Rodrigues Lobo (1580–1622), Portuguese poet

See also
Francisco Rodríguez (disambiguation)
Francisco Martins Rodrigues (1927–2008)